Orton is a civil parish in the Carlisle district, in the county of Cumbria, England. The parish includes the settlements of Baldwinholme, Great Orton, Little Orton, Orton Rigg and Woodhouses. In 2011 the parish had a population of 453. The parish touches Aikton, Beaumont, Burgh By Sands, Cummersdale, Dalston, Kirkbampton and Thursby. There are 12 listed buildings in Orton.

History 
The name "Orton" may mean 'Orri's farm/settlement' or 'black grouse farm/settlement'. The parish included the townships of Great Orton and Baldwinholme. Until 1974 it was in Cumberland.

References

External links 
 Parish council

Civil parishes in Cumbria
City of Carlisle